Denton is a village in the civil parish of Denton with Wootton, and the Dover District of Kent, England.

Wootton, the other parish village, is 1 mile to the southeast.

To the southwest of the village is the Grade II* listed Jacobean timber framed Tappington (or Tappington-Everard) Hall which dates to the 16th century. The house is where the cleric Richard Barham (1788–1845), under the pen name Thomas Ingoldsby, wrote The Ingoldsby Legends.

Field Marshal Lord Kitchener was created Baron Denton, of Denton in the County of Kent, on 27 July 1914.

References

External links

Villages in Kent
Dover District